A morula is a type of early-stage embryo. Morula may also refer to:

 Lebogang Morula, a South African football player
 Morula (gastropod), a genus of snails